Events from the year 1792 in Sweden

Incumbents
 Monarch – Gustav III then Gustav IV Adolf

Events
 January - King Gustav III summon the Riksdag of the Estates to Gävle. 
 February - The Riksdag of the Estates is dissolved. 
 16 March - Assassination of Gustav III: Gustav III of Sweden is assassinated by Jakob Johan Anckarström at a masked ball the Royal Swedish Opera in Stockholm. 
 29 March - Gustav III dies and are succeeded by his minor son, Gustav IV Adolf of Sweden, under the guardianship of his uncle, Duke Charles.
 The Funeral of Gustav III
 27 April – Jakob Johan Anckarström is executed for regicide in Stockholm. 
 July - Gustaf Adolf Reuterholm becomes a member of the guardian government and the de facto regent of Sweden.  
 20 December – The Marriage of Figaro is given for the first time in Sweden at the Stenborg Theatre in Stockholm with Didrik Gabriel Björn and Eleonora Säfström.
 The French Theater of Gustav III is dissolved.  
 Om det allmänna förståndets frihet by Thomas Thorild.
 Thomas Thorild is exiled for revolutionary ideas.
 Foundation of the Nationalmuseum.
 Foundation of the school of Johanna Lohm.

Births

 23 March – Carl Georg Brunius, art historian, archaeologist and architect  (died 1869)
 16 April - Ulla Stenberg, artist  (died 1858)
 24 July - Hedda Wrangel, composer  (died 1833)
 28 August – Karolina Bock, actress  (died 1872)
 Date unknown - Halta-Kajsa, tradition bearer  (died 1857)

Deaths

 15 December – Joseph Martin Kraus, composer  (born 1756)
 8 November - Hedvig Eleonora von Fersen, courtier  (born 1753)

References

 
Years of the 18th century in Sweden
Sweden